A List of Historical makeup of the Politburo Standing Committee of the Chinese Communist Party (CCP) since 1927–present.

5th PSC (1927–1927)
 Zhang Guotao
 Li Weihan
 Zhou Enlai
 Li Lisan
 Zhang Tailei

6th PSC (1928–1945)

6th PSC 1st Plenary Session
 Xiang Zhongfa
 Zhou Enlai
 Su Zhaozheng (died in office)
 Xiang Ying
 Cai Hesen (died in office)
 Li Lisan

6th PSC 3rd Plenary Session
 Xiang Zhongfa
 Zhou Enlai
 Qu Qiubai

6th PSC 4th Plenary Session
 Xiang Zhongfa
 Zhou Enlai
 Zhang Guotao
 Wang Ming (Chen Shaoyu)

6th PSC 5th Plenary Session
 Bo Gu (Qin Bangxian)
 Zhang Wentian
 Zhou Enlai
 Xiang Ying

6th PSC 6th Plenary Session
 Mao Zedong
 Zhang Wentian
 Chen Yun
 Kang Sheng
 Wang Ming (Chen Shaoyu)
 Ren Bishi

6th PSC 7th Plenary Session
 Mao Zedong
 Zhu De
 Liu Shaoqi
 Zhou Enlai
 Ren Bishi

7th de facto PSC (1945–1956)
Often known as the "Big Five".  Note: PSC originally termed the Party "Secretariat"

8th PSC (1956–1969)

First makeup (1956–1966)

Second makeup (1966–1969)
The Politburo Standing Committee was extensively changed in composition and importance of members by the 11th Plenary Session of the 8th Central Committee of the Chinese Communist Party (August 1966). Particularly, Lin Biao was elected only Vice-Chairman of the Central Committee, with Liu Shaoqi falling from 2nd member in importance to 8th.

9th PSC (1969–1973)

10th PSC (1973–1977)

First makeup (1973–1976)

Second makeup (1976–1977)

11th PSC (1977–1982)

First makeup (1977–1981)

Second makeup (1981–1982)
In the wake of Deng Xiaoping's ascension to "paramount leader", the Politburo Standing Committee was extensively changed in composition and importance of members by the Sixth Plenary Session of the 11th Central Committee of the Chinese Communist Party (June, 1981)—the same meeting that adopted a resolution condemning Mao Zedong's role in the Cultural Revolution. Note that, although Deng held the 3rd position in the PSC, it was he who maintained the actual power, mainly because his ideas were now at the centre of China's new political and economic line.

12th PSC (1982–1987)

13th PSC (1987–1992)

First makeup (1987–1989)

Second makeup (1989–1992)

14th PSC (1992–1997)

15th PSC (1997–2002)

16th PSC (2002–2007)
All nine members of the 16th PSC are university trained engineers.

17th PSC (2007–2012)

18th PSC (2012-2017)

19th PSC (2017–2022)

20th PSC (2022–present)

References

Notes

See also 

 Leader of the Chinese Communist Party
 Orders of precedence in China
 Provincial party standing committee

 
Collective heads of government